This is a list of Gã Mantse, rulers of the Gã State in southern Ghana.

See also

Ghana
Accra
Gold Coast

References

Rulers
Government of Ghana
Lists of African rulers
Ghana politics-related lists